Khudafarin Bridges or Khoda Afarin Bridges, are two arch bridges located at the border of Azerbaijan and Iran connecting the northern and southern banks of the Aras River. Located on the historical Silk Road, the 11-span bridge was built in the 11th–12th centuries and the 15-span bridge in the 13th century.

A 15-span bridge, which was built in the 12th century, is in working order; the second, an 11-span bridge built in the 13th century (the Ilkhanate era) is destroyed (only three middle spans have been preserved).

History 
The first written mention of one of the Khoodaaferin bridges belongs to the 14th century Iranian historian and geographer Hamdallah Mustawfi. He wrote that the bridge was built in 636 by the Arab General Bakr Ibn Abdullah during the campaign of the Arab army in the Eastern Transcaucasia. However, modern historians doubt that the Arabs were able to wage war and build a bridge at the same time. It is believed that, most likely, Mustawfi had in mind the organization of the crossing of the Arab army across the Aras using natural rock outcrops. The construction of the 15-span bridge, therefore, was attributed to a much later period – the 12th century.

Orientalists C. E. Bosworth and V. B. Fischer noted that Fazl Ibn Muhammad of the Sheddadid dynasty built one of the bridges across the Aras river for commercial and military-strategic purposes. The bridge linked Karabakh to Karadjadagh.

The 11-span bridge was restored in the 13th century during the Ilkhanate era due to the movement of huge masses of people in that period. The northern bank of Aras used to be a battlefield between the Ilkhanate and Golden Horde, and therefore there was a need to transport numerous troops. Besides, the remains of the tent city "Aladag" with structures for the nobility found here prove that the Ilkhanids made crossings over the Aras in winter.

After the occupation of the Jabrayil District by Armenian forces in 1993, the Khudaafarin bridges fell under the control of the unrecognized Republic of Artsakh. During this period a large dam straddling the river Araz was built directly west of the bridges but the bridge-ruins themselves remained intact. The dam was inaugurated in 2010.

Azerbaijan reestablished control over the villages on 18 October 2020 during the 2020 Nagorno-Karabakh war.

On 16 November 2020, President Ilham Aliyev and the Vice-President Mehriban Aliyeva paid a visit to the left bank of the Khoodaafarin bridge.

Researches 
The first description of the 15-span bridge was given in the work "the Art of Iran" published in 1938 under the editorship of A. Pope. The work also includes a schematic drawing of the bridge.

A. Sadikhzade was the first Azerbaijani scientist to study the bridges on the spot and perform their visual measurements, publishing the results of research in 1963 in the "History of Azerbaijani architecture".

A detailed study of the remains of the bridges and their measurements was made in 1974.

Construction 

The bridges are located at a distance of 800 m from each other.

The 11-span bridge is called "Synyg korpu" ("broken bridge").

Architects used river cobblestone (breakwaters and arches) and square baked brick (parapet of the upper part) to build the 15-span bridge.

Only natural rock outcrops were used as bridge abutments. The bridge spans have different sizes. Following the terrain structure, the bridge is not straight in the plan, but has a certain curvature.

The length of the 15-span bridge is about 200 meters, width – 4.5 m.  The highest point of the bridge is 10 m above the water level. The breakwaters protecting the bridge abutments are triangular in plan and are built of river cobblestone. On the reverse side, the breakwaters have a semicircular shape.

Abutments of the 11-span bridge were also built of rock outcrops. In the middle part of the river, the spans are longer and, consequently, higher, and closer to the banks, the spans are smaller in both width and height. The total length of this bridge is 130 m, width – 6 m, maximum height – 12 m above the water.

The binding solution of the 15-span bridge was made of clay with an admixture of milk.

See also
Khoda Afarin Dam
List of bridges in Azerbaijan

References

Bridges in Azerbaijan
Buildings and structures in East Azerbaijan Province
Bridges in Iran
Khoda Afarin County